The Liguang Cup, or Ricoh Cup, was a Chinese Go competition. It was held 15 times from 2000 to 2015.

Outline 
This tournament was sponsored by "Ricoh Hong Kong Limited".  The first year featured eight invited participants. The next year it was increased to 16 and then 54 in the third term. The 2011 game featured 48 players. The prize money was 80,000 ($12,300).

Past winners and runners-up

References

Go competitions in China